Yenny Sinisterra (born 4 May 2000) is a Colombian weightlifter. She won the silver medal in the women's 55 kg event at the 2019 Pan American Games held in Lima, Peru. A month earlier, at the 2019 Junior World Weightlifting Championships held in Suva, Fiji, she won the silver medal in the women's 55kg event.

In 2017, she won the gold medal in the women's 53 kg event at the Bolivarian Games held in Santa Marta, Colombia. In that same year, she also competed in the women's 53 kg event at the 2017 World Weightlifting Championships held in Anaheim, United States. The following year, she won the gold medal in the women's 53 kg event at the 2018 South American Games held in Cochabamba, Bolivia. She also competed in the women's 55 kg event at the 2018 World Weightlifting Championships held in Ashgabat, Turkmenistan.

In 2019, she competed in the women's 55 kg event at the World Weightlifting Championships held in Pattaya, Thailand. She finished in 5th place.

In February 2020, she was provisionally suspended after testing positive for the anabolic steroid boldenone. , her case is being contested at the Court of Arbitration for Sport as she may have ingested it after eating tainted meat and in Colombia boldenone is used for fattening cattle.

References

External links 
 

Living people
2000 births
Place of birth missing (living people)
Colombian female weightlifters
Weightlifters at the 2019 Pan American Games
Medalists at the 2019 Pan American Games
Pan American Games silver medalists for Colombia
Pan American Games medalists in weightlifting
South American Games gold medalists for Colombia
South American Games medalists in weightlifting
Competitors at the 2018 South American Games
Colombian sportspeople in doping cases
Doping cases in weightlifting
21st-century Colombian women